Royal Canadian Air Force Detachment Alliston was opened in July 1940 near the village of Alliston, Ontario (Lots 6, 7 & 8, Concession 11, Tecumseth Twp.). This small aerodrome served as the No. 2 Relief Landing Field for No. 1 Service Flying Training School of the British Commonwealth Air Training Plan, located at RCAF Station Camp Borden. The airfield at RCAF Detachment Alliston consisted of three runways in a standard triangular pattern, but unlike the RCAF Detachment Edenvale, they were compressed grass runways and there were no lights for night landings. The airfield was abandoned at the end of World War II and the land was sold for farmland.

Aerodrome
The field was listed as an "all-way turfed field" and had three runways listed as follows:

Today, not the slightest trace remains of RCAF Detachment Alliston.

References

 Material from A Short History of Abandoned and Downsized Canadian Military Bases - Introduction Royal Canadian Air Force Detachment Alliston 4 April 2011. Military Bruce Historical Writings (Bruce Forsyth) / CC BY-SA 2.5

Royal Canadian Air Force stations
Airports of the British Commonwealth Air Training Plan
Defunct airports in Ontario
Military installations closed in the 1940s
Military airbases in Ontario
1940 establishments in Ontario